Kumar Rajnish (born 28 December 1993) is an Indian cricketer. He made his first-class debut for Bihar against Uttarakhand in the 2018–19 Ranji Trophy on 1 November 2018. He made his Twenty20 debut on 5 November 2021, for Bihar in the 2021–22 Syed Mushtaq Ali Trophy. He made his List A debut on 14 December 2021, for Bihar in the 2021–22 Vijay Hazare Trophy.

References

External links
 

1993 births
Living people
Indian cricketers
Bihar cricketers
Place of birth missing (living people)